The 1948 Arizona State Sun Devils football team was an American football team that represented Arizona State College (later renamed Arizona State University) in the Border Conference during the 1948 college football season. In their second season under head coach Ed Doherty, the Sun Devils compiled a 5–5 record (3–2 against Border opponents) and outscored their opponents by a combined total of 276 to 192.

Schedule

References

Arizona State
Arizona State Sun Devils football seasons
Arizona State Sun Devils football